Please Don't Hate Me is the debut album by Icelandic singer and composer Lay Low. It was released on 19 October 2006 by the label COD Music and peaked at #2 on the Icelandic album chart. Two singles have been released from the album, the title track, which has been made into video, and Boy Oh Boy. It has sold over 10,000 units and has been awarded platinum in Iceland.

Track listing 
All songs and lyrics by Lovísa Elísabet Sigrúnardóttir.
 Mojo Love − 2:54 
 Home − 2:55 
 Boy Oh Boy − 3:21 
 I'll Try − 2:36 
 Please Don't Hate Me − 2:45 
 Too Late − 3:55 
 Bye Babe − 3:46 
 Mama − 2:53 
 Wonderplace − 4:13 
 Beauty − 3:22 
 Chucker − 5:06

Credits 

 Lovísa Elísabet Sigrúnardóttir (producer) − vocals, acoustic guitar
 Magnús Árni Øder Kristinsson (producer) - farfisa, slide guitar, synthesizers, bass guitar, keyboards
 Bassi Ólafsson - drums / percussion
 Sigurbjörn Már Valdimarsson - banjo

2006 albums